Amalia Mesa-Bains (born July 10, 1943), is a Chicana curator, author, visual artist, and educator. She is best known for her large-scale installations that reference home altars and ofrendas. Her work engages in a conceptual exploration of Mexican American women's spiritual practices that addresses colonial and imperial histories of display, the recovery of cultural memory, and their roles in identity formation.

In her writing, she examines the formation of Chicana identity and aesthetic practices, the shared experiences of historically marginalized communities in the United States, especially among women of color, and the role of multiculturalism within museums and cultural institutions. Her essay, "Domesticana: The Sensibility of Chicana Rasquache," theorized domesticana as a set of aesthetic strategies that use spaces and experiences historically associated with Mexican American women as sites for Chicana feminist reclamation.

Biography 
Mesa-Bains was born in Santa Clara, California. She received a B.A. in painting from San Jose State University before earning a M.A. in interdisciplinary education from San Francisco State University and a Ph.D. in clinical psychology from the Wright Institute in Berkeley, California. She then worked for the San Francisco Unified School District as a psychologist.  She was the regional committee chair (Northern California) for the exhibition Chicano Art: Resistance and Affirmation. She has written Ceremony of Spirit: Nature and Memory in Contemporary Latino Art.  Mesa-Bains lives in San Juan Bautista, California

Career 

Mesa-Bains worked as an educator for 20 years in the San Francisco Unified School District, where she served as an English as a Second Language teacher and a multicultural specialist. She also worked at the Far West Laboratory, where she performed case-based educational research. She co-wrote a casebook and teacher's guide entitled Diversity in the Classroom with Judith Shulman in 1993. As an artist, her works have been exhibited at the Smithsonian American Art Museum, the Whitney Museum of American Art,  the San Francisco Museum of Modern Art, Williams College Museum of Art, the Queens Museum in New York, the Contemporary Exhibition Center of Lyon, France,  the Kulturhuset in Stockholm, Sweden, the Museum of Modern Art in Dublin, Ireland, and the Culterforgenin in Copenhagen, Denmark.

Awards 
In 1989 she received the San Francisco Mission Cultural Center's Award of Honor, Association of American Cultures' Artist Award and the Chicana Foundation of Northern California's Distinguished Working Women Award in 1990, INTAR-Hispanic Arts Center's Golden Palm Award in 1991, and the MacArthur Fellowship award in 1992.

Exhibitions 
Mesa-Bains's first exhibit was at the 1967 Phelan Awards show that took place in the Palace of the Legion of Honor in San Francisco. She began creating altar installations in 1975.  Her artistic work is often autobiographical, relating to her Mexican Catholic heritage.  Although these works take the form of an altar, they are not specifically intended for religious use.  According to Kristin G. Congdon and Kara Kelley Hallmark, authors of Artists from Latin American Cultures: A Biographical Dictionary, "Mesa-Bains's altars often honor women who have broken social barriers."  Using techniques related to found object art, Mesa-Bains has incorporated "dried leaves, rocks, pre-Columbian ceramic fragments" and other unusual materials to construct artworks such as her 1987 work Grotto of the Virgins, which is dedicated to painter Frida Kahlo (1907–1954), actress Dolores del Río (1905–1983), and to the artist's grandmother.

In 1990, Mesa-Bains was in The Decade Show, a multidisciplinary exhibition of the art and issues of the 1980s collaboratively organized by The New Museum, The Museum of Contemporary Hispanic Art, and The Studio Museum in Harlem and Including more than 100 artists. James Luna, Carmelita Tropicana, Betye Saar, and David Wojnarowicz were amongst the more than 100 artists included across multiple disciplines.

Collections 

Her installation, Ofrenda for Dolores Del Rio (1984, revised 1991), was collected by the Smithsonian American Art Museum as part of the exhibition Our America: The Latino Presence in American Art (2013), which highlights Latino Art contributions to American art history. This work pays homage to Dolores del Rio, who was often cast as an "exotic" woman. Amalia has remarked the 1991 revised version can be differentiated from the 1984 version by the addition of a picture of the artists' mother, Marina González Mesa, just to the right of the lower central picture of Dolores in the silver dress.

References

 Mesa-Bains, Amalia (Fall 1999). "Domesticana: The Sensibility of Chicana Rasquache." Aztlán: Journal of Chicano Studies Vol. 24 No.2: 157–167.

Further reading 
How to Altar the World: Amalia Mesa-Bains’s Art Shifts the Way We See Art History by Maximilíano Durón

Living people
1943 births
21st-century American psychologists
San Francisco State University alumni
San Jose State University alumni
Wright Institute alumni
MacArthur Fellows
Hispanic and Latino American women in the arts
American art curators
American women curators
American installation artists
Chicano
American art critics
21st-century American women
20th-century American psychologists